Delhi Daredevils (DD) are a franchise cricket team based in Delhi, India, which plays in the Indian Premier League (IPL). They were one of the eight teams that competed in the 2018 Indian Premier League.

Auction
Each franchise was allowed to retain a maximum of five players from their current squad, subject to the following restrictions:
 A maximum of 3 players could be retained before the 2018 IPL auction
 A maximum of 3 players could be retained through a right-to-match card during the auction.
 A maximum of 3 capped Indian players could be retained.
 A maximum of 2 uncapped Indian players could be retained.
 A maximum of 2 overseas (non-Indian) players could be retained.

The auction was held on 27–28 January in Bangalore.

The following three players were retained by Delhi:

Chris Morris
Shreyas Iyer
Rishabh Pant

The franchise acquired the following players during the auction:

Current squad
 Players with international caps are listed in bold.

Season

League table

Fixtures

Statistics

Most runs

Source: Cricinfo

Most wickets

Source: Cricinfo

References

External links
IPL team Delhi Daredevils web page on official IPL T20 website - IPLT20.com
The Official Delhi Daredevils Site

Delhi Capitals seasons